Hockey at the 1932 Olympics may refer to:

Ice hockey at the 1932 Winter Olympics
Field hockey at the 1932 Summer Olympics